Dipsas is a genus of nonvenomous New World snakes in the subfamily Dipsadinae of the family Colubridae. The genus Sibynomorphus has been moved here. The genus Dipsas are as known as snail-eater.

Geographic range
Species in the genus Dipsas are found from southern Mexico through Central America and South America, as far as Argentina and Paraguay.

Taxonomy
The genus Dipsas includes over 30 distinct species.

Description
Coloration and color pattern may vary, but often consist of black and brown, frequently with alternating rings separated by white.

Behavior and diet
Species in the genus Dipsas are mostly arboreal snakes that mainly feed on land snails and slugs.

Species
The following species are recognized as being valid.
Dipsas albifrons  - Sauvage's snail-eater
Dipsas alternans  - Jan's snail-eater
Dipsas andiana  
Dipsas aparatiritos  
Dipsas articulata  - American snail-eater 
Dipsas baliomelas  
Dipsas bicolor  - two-colored snail-eater
Dipsas bobridgelyi  - Bob Ridgely's snail-eater 
Dipsas bothropoides 
Dipsas brevifacies  - snail-eating thirst snake, short-faced snail-eater
Dipsas bucephala  - neotropical snail-eater
Dipsas catesbyi  - Catesby's snail-eater 
Dipsas chaparensis   
Dipsas cisticeps  - neotropical snail-eater
Dipsas copei  
Dipsas elegans 
Dipsas ellipsifera 
Dipsas gaigeae  - Gaige's thirst snail-eater
Dipsas georgejetti  - George Jett's snail-eater
Dipsas gracilis  - graceful snail-eater
Dipsas incerta  - Jan's snail-eater 
Dipsas indica  - neotropical snail-eater
Dipsas jamespetersi Orcés & Almendáriz, 1989
Dipsas klebbai  - Klebba's snail-eate
Dipsas latifrontalis  - broad-fronted snail-eater, Venezuela snail-eater
Dipsas lavillai Scrocchi, Porto & Rey, 1993
Dipsas maxillaris  - Werner's thirst snake 
Dipsas mikanii (Schlegel, 1837)
Dipsas neuwiedi (Ihering, 1911) - Neuwied's tree snake
Dipsas nicholsi  
Dipsas oligozonata Orcés & Almendáriz, 1989
Dipsas oneilli Rossman & Thomas, 1979 - O'Neill's tree snake
Dipsas oreas  - Ecuador snail-eater
Dipsas oswaldobaezi  - Oswaldo Báez's snail-eater
Dipsas pakaraima 
Dipsas palmeri  - Palmer's snail-eater
Dipsas pavonina  -northern snail-eater  
  
Dipsas peruana  - Peruvian snail-eater, Peru snail-eate
 

Dipsas praeornata  
Dipsas pratti  - Pratt's snail-eater
Dipsas sanctijoannis  -  tropical snail-eater
Dipsas sazimai  
Dipsas schunkii  - Schunk's snail-eater 
Dipsas temporalis  - temporal snail-eater
Dipsas tenuissima  - Taylor's snail-eater
Dipsas trinitatis   Trinidad snail-eater
Dipsas turgida (Cope, 1868) - Bolivian tree snake
Dipsas vagrans (Dunn, 1923) - Dunn's tree snake
Dipsas vagus (Jan, 1863) - Jan's tree snake
Dipsas variegata  - variegated snail-eater
Dipsas ventrimaculata (Boulenger, 1885) - Boulenger's tree snake
Dipsas vermiculata  -  vermiculate snail-eater
Dipsas viguieri  - Bocourt's snail-eater
Dipsas williamsi Carillo de Espinoza, 1974 - Williams's tree snake

Nota bene: A binomial authority in parentheses indicates that the species was originally described in a genus other than Dipsas.

References

Further reading
Freiberg MA (1982). Snakes of South America. Hong Kong: T.F.H. Publications. 189 pp. . (Genus Dipsas, pp. 93–94).
Laurenti JN (1768). Specimen medicum, exhibens synopsin reptilium emendatam cum experimentis circa venena et antidota reptilium austriacorum. Vienna: "Joan. Thom. Nob. de Trattnern". 214 pp. + Plates I-V. (Dipsas, new genus, pp. 89–90). (in Latin).

External links

 
Reptiles of Central America
Reptiles of South America
Snake genera
Taxa named by Josephus Nicolaus Laurenti